Chartergellus is a genus of eusocial wasps of Epiponini with ten described species.
The range of the species within this genus extends from Costa Rica to southeastern Brazil.
The genus was described by J. Becquaert in 1938.

Species

  Chartergellus afoveatus Cooper 1993
  Chartergellus amazonicus Richards 1978
  Chartergellus atectus Richards 1978
  Chartergellus communis Richards 1978
  Chartergellus frontalis (Fabricius 1804)
  Chartergellus jeannei Andena and Soleman 2015
  Chartergellus nigerrimus Richards 1978
  Chartergellus punctatior Richards 1978
  Chartergellus sanctus Richards 1978
  Chartergellus zonatus (Spinosa 1851)

References

Vespidae